Unusual Suspects may refer to:

Unusual Suspects (Julia Fordham and Paul Reiser album), a 2010 album by Julia Fordham and Paul Reiser
Unusual Suspects (Leslie West album), a 2011 album by Leslie West, a founding member of Mountain
Unusual Suspects (TV series), American documentary television series
"Unusual Suspects" (The X-Files), 3rd episode of the 5th season of the American television series The X-Files
"Unusual Suspects" (CSI: NY), 21st episode of the 6th season of the American television series CSI: NY

The Unusual Suspects, a 2021 Australian miniseries
The Unusual Suspects (novel), 2005 novel by Michael Buckley 
"The Unusual Suspects" (Dawson's Creek episode), 8th episode of the 4th season of the American television series Dawson's Creek
"The Unusual Suspects" (Quack Pack), 15th episode of the American television series  Quack Pack

See also
The Unusual Suspect
Usual suspects (disambiguation)